"Isle of Beauty, Isle of Splendour" is the popular title for the national anthem of Dominica. It was adopted upon the island gaining statehood in 1967 and again with Dominica's independence in 1978. The lyrics are by Wilfred Oscar Morgan Pond (1912–1985), and the music was composed by Lemuel McPherson Christian OBE (1917–2000).

The anthem was listed by The Guardian as one of the 10 best national anthems of countries competing at the 2008 Beijing Olympics.

Lyrics
I
Isle of beauty, isle of splendour,
Isle to all so sweet and fair,
All must surely gaze in wonder
At thy gifts so rich and rare.
Rivers, valleys, hills and mountains,
All these gifts we do extol.
Healthy land, so like all fountains,
Giving cheer that warms the soul.

II
Dominica, God hath blest thee
With a clime benign and bright,
Pastures green and flowers of beauty
Filling all with pure delight,
And a people strong and healthy,
Full of godly reverent fear.
May we ever seek to praise Thee
For these gifts so rich and rare.

III
Come ye forward, sons and daughters
Of this gem beyond compare.
Strive for honour, sons and daughters,
Do the right, be firm, be fair.
Toil with hearts and hands and voices.
We must prosper! Sound the call,
In which ev'ryone rejoices,
"All for Each and Each for All."

References

External links
 Anthem, Government of the Commonwealth of Dominica
 "Dominica: Isle of Beauty, Isle of Splendour", YouTube.

National symbols of Dominica
Dominica music
North American anthems
National anthems
National anthem compositions in C major